Minh Van Nguyen (born May 15), a Vietnamese American professional poker player, is a two-time World Series of Poker bracelet winner residing in Bell Gardens, California.

Nguyen learned to play poker from his cousin, poker professional Men Nguyen, and has gone on to become a regular on the poker tournament circuit since 1999.

Nguyen finished 24th in the $10,000 no limit hold'em main event at the 2002 World Series of Poker (WSOP), earning $40,000. He went on to win a bracelet at the 2003 World Series of Poker in the $1,500 seven-card stud hi-lo split event, and would finish 11th in the Main Event later that year.

Nguyen earned a second WSOP bracelet at the 2004 WSOP in the $1,500 pot limit hold'em event, and finished 2nd to Mark Seif in the $1,500 no limit hold'em event at the 2005 WSOP.

Nguyen  finished in 7th place at the inaugural Doyle Brunson North American Poker Championship, earning $60,000. He also finished in 8th place at the 2005 World Poker Finals, earning $172,800.

World Series of Poker bracelets 

As of 2009, his total live tournament winnings have exceeded $2,100,000. His 26 cashes at the WSOP account for $1,033,671 of those winnings.

References

External links
 World Poker Tour Profile

American poker players
Living people
American people of Vietnamese descent
People from Bell Gardens, California
Vietnamese poker players
World Series of Poker bracelet winners
Year of birth missing (living people)